The 2011–12 Liga Indonesia Premier Division season is the seventeenth edition of Indonesian Premier Division since its establishment in 1994. The competition is managed by PT Liga Prima Indonesia Sportindo (LPIS).

The participant initially consists of 36 clubs but later reduced to only 28 clubs, divided into three groups.

Teams

Stadium and locations

Personnel and kit

Note: Flags indicate national team as has been defined under FIFA eligibility rules. Players and Managers may hold more than one non-FIFA nationality.

Managerial changes

Foreign player

Group 1

Group 2

Group 3

Group 1

Results

Group 2

Results

Group 3

Results

Grand Finals

Three champion clubs from each group at 2011–12 Premier Division will be met in the final round which will begin and held in 1 to 5 July 2012 ahead. The third club is Pro Duta FC who won the Group 1, Group 2 champion Persepar Palangkaraya, and Perseman Manokwari winner of Group 3.

Drawing Competition 2011–12 Premier Division Final Round was held at the Office of PT Liga Prima Indonesia Sportindo (LPIS) in Jakarta, Wednesday, 20 June afternoon. The drawing was also attended by Deputy Secretary-General of PSSI Saleh Ismail Mukadar, CEO LPIS Widjajanto, and Hendriyana, Head of Competition LPIS. While the three clubs who attend each represented by Handoyo Subosito (Pro Duta FC), Warda Rocky M. Dahan (Persepar Palangkaraya), and Hendrik Renjaan (Perseman Manokwari).

Table

Results

Champions

Season statistics

Top scorers

All round top scorers

Top scorer by group
goals scored in grand-final are not included

References

External links
 Official website

Second tier Indonesian football league seasons
Indonesian Premier Division seasons
2011–12 in Indonesian football leagues
Indonesia